Lt. Gen. Khoshal Sadat is a military personnel in Afghanistan, previously serving as Deputy Interior Minister for Security.

References

External links 
 

Generals
Living people
Afghan military personnel
People from Ghor Province
Afghan military officers
Year of birth missing (living people)